Reducto da Salga is a landmark in the Azores. It is located in Angra do Heroísmo, on the island of Terceira.

 

Buildings and structures in Angra do Heroísmo
Forts in the Azores